Jackowo may refer to:
Avondale, Chicago
Jackowo, Kuyavian-Pomeranian Voivodeship (north-central Poland)
Jackowo, Pomeranian Voivodeship (north Poland)